Neenan is a surname. Notable people with the surname include:

Audrie J. Neenan (born 1950), American actress
Joe Neenan (born 1959), English footballer

See also
Keenan